The Vixen was a recreational vehicle designed by Bill Collins and built from 1986 until 1989. A total of 587 Vixen motorhomes of three different types were built: the Vixen 21 TD (1986–1987), Vixen 21 SE (1988–1989), and Vixen 21 XC (1986–1987).

Often noted as the "Driver's RV", it has an exceptionally low center of gravity and wide stance for an RV. It had a top speed of 100 MPH, and claimed an average of 30 MPG using a BMW M21 turbo-diesel engine.  Wind tunnel testing was used to create a completely smooth fiberglass exterior top and bottom, resulting in a drag coefficient of less than .30 for early TD models.

Initial design
The Vixen was designed as an answer to the GMC motorhome. The Vixen was designed to be stored in a typical garage as it was only 6 feet high and 21 feet long. Despite its small size by motorhome standards, the Vixen was marketed as having all of the features of larger competitors. Such features included a generator and water heater. Two house batteries and one of the first electric inverters in an RV allowed the owner to run the microwave, air-conditioning, and anything else which could be plugged into 120-volt outlets, off the batteries that were charged by the 120-amp alternator. The Vixen could also be plugged in at a typical campsite outlet.  Water came from the fresh water tank or services at a campsite and was heated by a heat exchanger. The same engine heat was used to warm the passenger compartment. Since diesels do not develop waste heat quickly, there was also an auxiliary diesel heater that could raise the temperature of the engine coolant. This helped with winter starting, keeping the RV warm, and the water hot. The heater was fuel-efficient and didn't need to stop for propane to fuel it. Unfortunately, it was notorious for needing service.

Upon arriving at the destination the fiberglass roof hinged up on one side and fold-out windows filled the gap, allowing a 6'2" individual to stand fully and walk around. A curtain in the bath attached to the raised roof to keep water in the shower and for privacy, with a sump to move water from the shower floor up to the holding tank. The front seats flipped backwards to join the dinette to seat four at meal time. Both seats folded flat to provide the front bed, while in the back above the engine was a full-time, full-sized bed that used a standard mattress. The kitchen included a microwave, an electric refrigerator, a sink above the hot water heat exchanger, and an alcohol fired stove. Those who do a lot of cooking sometimes replace the stove with a modern marine diesel powered cook top.

Reaction and modifications
Though the driving press seemed to love it, the public only bought a bit over 300 of the original TD model in the first two years of business. Financing took a hit. The company Vixen was invented around the design and as the sales didn't materialize the designers and factory started making changes hoping for a hit. The first change was a model called the XC that was envisioned as a large taxi or limo. Removing the kitchen and bath, and installing more couches, but keeping the bed in back there was now seating for nine. The following year the company tried to appeal to the traditional RV market by including all the touches liked by the RV buyer, a gasoline engine with more off-the-line power and no problems with overheating on mountain roads, automatic transmission, a real water heater, and a propane furnace. All this was wrapped in a full-time extended roof that a 6'4" person could stand comfortably under.  Even regular roof air-conditioning was included, at the cost of the height advantage of the original Vixen TD, now needing a high-roof garage, or suffering outdoor parking. This model, the SE, would be the last for Vixen, and with fewer than 300 sold the company folded in 1989. Many of the assets were purchased by a group of owners who have gone on to support the aging Vixens with service and support.

References

External links
 The history of the Vixen motor home
 Vixen Owner's Association
 VixenRV Website
 Vixen Story

Recreational vehicle manufacturers